Thaen is a 2021 Indian Tamil-language drama film written and directed by Ganesh Vinayakan. Tharun and Abarnathi feature in the lead role, while Aruldoss and Bava Lakshmanan among others play supporting roles.

The film narrates the tale of an uneducated young rural beekeeper facing seemingly unsurmountable challenges when his wife is diagnosed with a rare disease. The film was released on 19 March 2021 and received critical acclaim for its direction, theme and realistic performances by the lead actors .

Cast
Tharun as Velu
Abarnathi as Poongodi
Aruldoss
Bava Lakshmanan
Anusri

Production
Alongside Asuran (2019), the film was the only other Tamil film screened at the Indian Panorama 2020 event in Goa. In 2021 it was also shown at the Pune International Film Festival and the Cinequest Film And Creativity Festival.

Soundtrack
Soundtrack was composed by Sanath Bharathwaj.
Usuraye Ulukkudhe - Saindhavi
Alli Poo - Haricharan

Release
The film opened on 19 March 2021 across Tamil Nadu. A reviewer from Times of India wrote "the hard-hitting dialogues about the government identifying its citizens are engaging enough in the film which has an overdose of melodrama."

A reviewer from The New Indian Express noted "Despite having able lead actors, because of issues with the direction, there is a disconnect between the audience and the film". The critic added "Though Ganesh Vinayakan's Thaen aims to weave a hard-hitting backstory inspired by this tragic event, all the impact it leaves us with is that of a passing news scroll". A reviewer from Film Companion noted "at the center of Thaen is the question of nature versus civilization. It makes a forceful argument for the preservation of our hills, but it's missing nuance and depth." Sify.com called the film a "hard-hitting emotional drama". This movie is now streaming on SonyLiv.

Awards
2020 Cult Critic Movie Awards

References

External links
 

2021 films
2021 drama films
2020s Tamil-language films
Indian drama films